Ronald Wayne Langacker (born December 27, 1942) is an American linguist and professor emeritus at the University of California, San Diego. He is best known as one of the founders of the cognitive linguistics movement and the creator of cognitive grammar. He has also made significant contributions to the comparative study of Uto-Aztecan languages, publishing several articles on historical Uto-Aztecan linguistics, as well as editing collections of grammar sketches of under-described Uto-Aztecan languages.

Life
Born in Fond du Lac, Wisconsin, Langacker received his Ph.D. from the University of Illinois at Urbana–Champaign in 1966. From 1966 until 2003, he was professor of linguistics at the University of California, San Diego. From 1997 until 1999 he also served as president of the International Cognitive Linguistics Association.

Career
Langacker develops the central ideas of cognitive grammar in his seminal, two-volume Foundations of Cognitive Grammar, which became a major departure point for the emerging field of cognitive linguistics. Cognitive grammar treats human languages as consisting solely of semantic units, phonological units, and symbolic units (conventional pairings of phonological and semantic units). Like  construction grammar, and unlike many mainstream linguistic theories, cognitive grammar extends the notion of symbolic units to the grammar of languages. Langacker further assumes that linguistic structures are motivated by general cognitive processes. In formulating his theory, he makes extensive use of principles of gestalt psychology and draws analogies between linguistic structure and aspects of visual perception.

In 2020, Langacker contributed to the volume, entitled Usage-based Dynamics in Second Language Development to honour Marjolijn Verspoor's work in applied linguistics.

Partial bibliography
Foundations of Cognitive Grammar, Volume I, Theoretical Prerequisites. Ronald W. Langacker. Stanford, California: Stanford University Press, 1987. .
Concept, Image, and Symbol: The Cognitive Basis of Grammar. Ronald W. Langacker. Berlin & New York: Mouton de Gruyter, 1991. , .
Foundations of Cognitive Grammar, Volume II, Descriptive Application. Ronald W. Langacker. Stanford, California: Stanford University Press, 1991. .
Grammar and Conceptualization. Ronald W. Langacker. Berlin & New York: Mouton de Gruyter, 1999. .
Cognitive Grammar: A Basic Introduction. Ronald W. Langacker. New York: Oxford University Press, 2008. .
Investigations in Cognitive Grammar (Cognitive Linguistics Research) Ronald W. Langacker. Berlin & New York: Mouton de Gruyter, July 15, 2009

Quotes/examples 
 "After I ran over the cat with our car, there was cat all over the driveway." (Concept, Image, and Symbol: The Cognitive Basis of Grammar, p. 73)
 "I can think of a unicorn with daisies growing out of its nostrils, but I don't need a name for it."

Relevant literature
Bennet, Phil. 2014. "Langacker’s cognitive grammar." The Bloomsbury Companion to Cognitive Linguistics, ed. by Littlemore, Jeannette, and John R. Taylor, eds., 29-48. Bloomsbury Publishing

References

External links
Ronald Langacker's UCSD faculty page
International Cognitive Linguistics Association

1942 births
Living people
People from Fond du Lac, Wisconsin
University of Illinois Urbana-Champaign alumni
Linguists from the United States
American cognitive scientists
American Mesoamericanists
Linguists of Mesoamerican languages
University of California, San Diego faculty
20th-century Mesoamericanists
Linguists of Uto-Aztecan languages